William Scott (14 June 1882 – 30 September 1965) was an Australian cricketer. He played sixteen first-class cricket matches for Victoria between 1904 and 1912.

See also
 List of Victoria first-class cricketers

References

External links
 

1882 births
1965 deaths
Australian cricketers
Victoria cricketers
Cricketers from Melbourne
People from North Melbourne